Genesis Motor, LLC, commonly referred to as Genesis, is the luxury vehicle division of the South Korean vehicle manufacturer Hyundai Motor Company. Initially envisioned along with plans for Hyundai's new luxury Genesis sedan in 2004, the Genesis brand was officially announced as an independent marque on 4 November 2015, launching their first Genesis standalone model, the Genesis G90, in 2017. Genesis models are designed in Rüsselsheim (Germany), Namyang (South Korea), and Irvine (United States); and produced in Ulsan (South Korea). In 2020, J.D. Power named Genesis the most dependable automotive brand and in 2021 the most technologically innovative in North America.

History

Conception and under Hyundai
Hyundai conceived "Concept Genesis" in 2003 and introduced its first model in 2007 as a "progressive interpretation of the modern rear-wheel drive sports sedan". The body design took three years and the total cost of the program was $500 million over a development period of 23 months. Reliability testing ran for 800,000 miles. 

There was internal debate whether to sell the Genesis as a Hyundai, or to launch a new brand for it, either as a separate retail chain, or through Hyundai dealerships. Hyundai introduced the Genesis in 2008 at the North American International Auto Show.

Stand-alone brand
In 2015, Chris Hosford, Hyundai's United States spokesman, cited three main reasons for making Genesis a stand-alone brand:
 Genesis' seven years already in the luxury car market was successful;
 Genesis ranked among the top three segment sellers;
 Customers demanded a separate Genesis division.

Genesis Motor announced the launch of its first model, the G90 (EQ900 in South Korea), on 9 December 2015. Genesis launched in the United States in late 2016 with the G80 and G90. In the U.S., Genesis vehicles are sold through a subset of existing Hyundai dealers, with designated space for Genesis within the dealerships' showrooms.

In June 2018, according to the reports, Genesis Motor ranked first on J.D. Power's Initial Quality Study. 

In May 2021, Genesis launched in the European market alongside the debut of Genesis G70 Shooting Brake. Genesis is now being marketed in South Korea, China, the Middle East, Russia, Canada, Australia and the United States, Europe, and the rest of Asia.

Models

History
The initial Genesis vehicle was marketed in South Korea as the Genesis G90, which is the brand's flagship model. In late 2016, the brand launched in the United States with two models: the G80 (previously sold as the Hyundai Genesis) and G90 (previously sold as the Hyundai Equus). On 14 September 2016 a third model, the Genesis G70, was unveiled in Namyang, South Korea. The G70 was introduced to the United States market during the 2018 New York Auto Show on 28 March 2018.

The brand's first SUV, the GV80, formally debuted on 14 January 2020. In April 2021, Genesis unveiled its first production electric vehicle, the Electrified G80. At the 2021 Shanghai International Automobile Industry Exhibition, Genesis showed three new vehicles: the Electrified G80, the Genesis X Concept, and an EV-based Gran Turismo concept car. In August 2021, Genesis released first-hand images of the latest GV60, the new EV SUV for the brand.

Naming and current lineup
Genesis follows an alphanumeric naming convention; sedan models are named by combining the letter "G" with a number (70, 80, 90, and so on), while crossovers are named by combining the letters "GV" and a number. Battery-powered versions of internal-combustion models are denoted by the word "Electrified" preceding the alphanumeric.

Concepts
The Hyundai Vision G concept predates the official launch of Genesis as a separate marque, but it carried Genesis badges and when it was debuted, Hyundai introduced planned actions for the Genesis brand.

Personnel 
Jaehoon (Jay) Chang is global head and executive vice president. Luc Donckerwolke, former design director of Volkswagen subsidiaries Bentley, Lamborghini and Audi, is chief creative officer. Claudia Marquez, former senior director of sales operations at Infiniti, is chief operating officer of Genesis North America. Markus Henne, former vice-president at Mercedes-Benz, is CEO of Genesis Motor China. SangYup Lee, former designer of the Bentley Continental GT and C-6 Chevrolet Corvette, is head of design. Filippo Perini, former Lamborghini head of design, is chief designer. Albert Biermann, former head of the BMW M performance division, oversees tuning and performance as executive vice president of performance development and high performance vehicles. Fayez Rahman, former development leader at BMW, is vice-president of architecture development. Andrea Jensen, former designer at Škoda and Volkswagen, heads colour and trim.

Production aggregate
Between November 2015 and October 2018, Genesis sold 206,882 vehicles; of the total, 127,283 were G80 models, 52,417 were G90 units, and 27,182 were G70s. In 2016, Genesis sold 66,029 models in South Korea.

Marketing
Genesis is the official sponsor of the NFL, the Genesis Invitational at the Riviera Country Club, the Scottish Open, and the Condé Nast International Conference. Architect Rem Koolhaas designed the world's first ever Genesis showroom in Seoul's Gangnam district. Genesis Connected Services, a cloud-based service, features remote vehicle functions such as remote start with climate control and remote lock/unlock is available on iOS, Android and an Alexa Skill developed with Amazon. The Genesis Intelligent Assistant was developed for Android and iOS, providing similar service to Genesis Connected Services.

Studio 

 Genesis Studio in Hanam

On 9 September 2016, the Genesis Studio Hanam was opened at Starfield in 750, Misa-daero, Hanam-si, Gyeonggi-do. The studio is about 476-metre square, and the vintage concrete finishing and waterproof steel plate differ from other existing exhibition halls. The studio displays real vehicle doors that allow visitors to check flagship models, new vehicles and concept cars, exterior colours and interior materials.

 Genesis Gangnam

On 6 January 2018, the Genesis Studio Gangnam opened at 410, Yeongdong-daero, Gangnam-gu. The Gangnam studio displays engine line-ups and different colours of all models. Unlike Genesis Studio Hanam, which shows the brand's sensibility and philosophy, Genesis Gangnam has constructed a space focusing on product experience. It is about 1296 metre square and has applied different materials and techniques from existing exhibition halls, such as vintage concrete finishes and hot-rolled steel plates.

 Genesis Suji

The Genesis Suji, which opened on 30 July 2020, at 11, Pungdeokcheon-ro 197 beon-gil, Suji-gu, Yongin-si, Gyeonggi-do, is the largest Genesis vehicle exhibition hall in Korea with four stories above the ground and about 4992-metre square. The exterior of the building used weatherproof steel plates to express the value of Genesis. The interior of the exhibition hall is an open structure connected with exposed concrete imprinted with wood grain patterns and glass (1st to 3rd floors), which embodies bold spatial beauty.

 Genesis Studio Anseong

On 19 November 2020, Genesis Studio Anseong, which opened at 3930–39, Seodong-daero, Gongdo-eup, Anseong-si, Gyeonggi-do, is the second mall-type space after Hanam and was constructed on a scale of about 664-metre square. All Genesis models can be viewed, experienced, and purchased and consists of a total of four experience zones: a brand experience zone, a product experience zone, an interior and exterior experience zone, and a test drive experience zone.

 Others

In addition, Genesis Studio Chengdu was opened on 4 June 2021, including Genesis Studio Shanghai, which was built on 8 April 2021, with a total capacity of 1,300 square meters. Also, Genesis Studios in Sydney, New York, and Europe are being operated.

Former designers
Manfred Fitzgerald (2016–2019), former director at Lamborghini, was executive vice president & global head.
Bozhena Lalova (2016–2019), former interior designer at Mercedes-Benz, headed colour and trim.
Alexander (Sasha) Selipanov (2017–2019), former designer of the Bugatti Chiron and Vision Gran Turismo, lead exterior and advanced design.

References

External links
 Official website

 
Luxury motor vehicle manufacturers
South Korean brands
Vehicle manufacturing companies established in 2015
Car brands